

The Albatros L 58 was a German airliner of the 1920s. It was a single-engine cantilever monoplane which accommodated the pilot in an open cockpit at the top of the fuselage, and seated five-six passengers within it.

Variants
 L 58 – original production version with Maybach Mb.IVa engine and eight-passenger capacity
 L 58a – version with Rolls-Royce Eagle VIII engine and six-passenger capacity

Operators
 
 Deutsche Luftreederei
 Deutsche Aero-Lloyd
 Deutsche Luft Hansa

Specifications (L 58)

See also

References
 
 German Aircraft between 1919–1945((2005=Secret Agent 420))
 "Albatros 8-Seater Cabin Monoplane" Aviation And Aircraft Journal Vol. 10 1921 page 505
 "The Albatros Commercial Monoplane, Type L.57" Flight Vol. XIV 1922 page 587 (Although still referred to as the L.57, appears to describe an early version of the L 58.)

Single-engined tractor aircraft
1920s German airliners
L 058